Kondavelagada is a village in Nellimarla Mandal of the Vizianagaram district, located in the state of Andhra Pradesh in India. As of 2011 the population of the village was 4651. The Indian weight lifter Santoshi Matsa was born here.

References

Villages in Vizianagaram district